Jim Henson's Creature Shop is a special/visual effects company founded in 1979 by puppeteer Jim Henson, creator of The Muppets. The company is based out of Burbank, California, United States.

History 
Jim Henson's Creature Shop was originally created as a partnership with British illustrator Brian Froud to facilitate the production of The Dark Crystal. Originally located in Hampstead, London, it received its name in order to differentiate it from Henson's original puppet workshop in New York City. It was then used for future films such as Labyrinth and The Storyteller.

It was relocated to Camden Town following Henson's death in 1990 and his son, Brian Henson, took over. A third location in Burbank, California opened to serve Hollywood, and one of its first projects was the Dinosaurs television series.

Since The Jim Henson Company sold off the rights to The Muppets brand to Disney in 2004; the Muppet Workshop in New York is now credited as Jim Henson's Creature Shop. In the modern day, the New York shop specializes in hand puppets, including building The Muppets and most of the puppets in Sesame Street. The Los Angeles branch creates more realistic animatronic creatures and creature suits.

The location at Camden Town, London closed in Spring 2005 and was converted into a luxury apartment known as The Henson.

In addition to practical effects, the shop also specializes in "digital puppetry", a form of computer animation that controls a digital avatar using manual puppet controls to animate them more quickly and easily than if it was entirely digital. This is known as the "Henson Digital Puppetry Studio" and is used extensively in television, including the entirety of the series Sid the Science Kid.

Besides films, the Creature Shop has created costumes for live events. They created a realistic Smilodon "full-suit puppet" for a show at the Natural History Museum of Los Angeles County, which cost more than $100,000.

Selected filmography 
 Sesame Street (1969–present) (puppets (built by Jim Henson's Creature Shop, New York))
 The Dark Crystal (1982) (creature effects)
 Return to Oz (1985) (creature effects and puppets)
 Dreamchild (1985) (creature effects)
 Labyrinth (1986) (creature effects)
 The Storyteller (1987) (creature effects)
 The Bear (1988) (creature effects)
 Lighthouse Island (1989) (visual effects)
 Monster Maker (1989)
 The Ghost of Faffner Hall (1989) (puppets)
 Teenage Mutant Ninja Turtles (1990) (creature effects)
 The Witches (1990) (creature effects)
 Teenage Mutant Ninja Turtles II: The Secret of the Ooze (1991) (creature effects)
 Dinosaurs (1991-1994) (creature effects)
 The Polar Bear King (1991) (creature effects)
 Honey, I Blew Up the Kid (1992) (Big Bunny plush doll)
 The Muppet Christmas Carol (1992) (special character effects and miniatures)
 The Neverending Story III (1994) (creature effects)
 The Flintstones (1994) (creature effects)
 Babe (1995) (creature effects)
 101 Dalmatians (1996) (creature effects)
 The Adventures of Pinocchio (1996) (creature effects)
 The English Patient (1996) (prosthetic effects)
 Muppet Treasure Island (1996) (miniatures)
 The Phantom (1996) (The Phantom suit)
 Samson and Delilah (1996) (lion attacking Samson)
 Buddy (1997) (creature effects)
 George of the Jungle (1997) (creature effects)
 Lost in Space (1998) (creature effects)
 Dr. Dolittle (1998) (creature effects)
 Jack Frost (1998) (Jack Frost snowman effects)
 Alice In Wonderland (1999) (creature effects)
 Animal Farm (1999) (creature effects)
 My Favorite Martian (1999) (Martian creature design)
 The Talented Mr. Ripley (1999) (visual effects)
 The Flintstones in Viva Rock Vegas (2000) (creature effects)
 Rat (2000) (creature effects)
 Brotherhood of the Wolf (2001) (creature effects)
 Cats & Dogs (2001) (creature effects)
 Harry Potter and the Philosopher's Stone (2001) (creature effects)
 Gosford Park (2001) (digital effects)
 Snow Dogs (2002) (Demon)
 Stuart Little 2 (2002) (creature effects)
 The Country Bears (2002) (creature effects)
 Looney Tunes: Back in Action (2003) (stand-in puppets)
 5 Children & It (2004) (character animation, visual effects, digital puppetry and animatronics)
 Pride (2004) (visual effects and animatronics)
 The Hitchhiker's Guide to the Galaxy (2005) (puppet fabrication)
 Batman Begins (2005) (visual effects of The Scarecrow)
 Mee-Shee: The Water Giant (2005) (creature effects, visual effects and digital puppetry)
 The Hangover (2009) (tiger in car)
 Where the Wild Things Are (2009) (creature effects)
 The Muppets (2011) (puppet costumes only)
 Muppets Most Wanted (2014) (puppets, along with Puppet Heap)
 Jim Henson's Creature Shop Challenge (2014)
 Oscar's Hotel for Fantastical Creatures (2014-2015)
 Grumpy Cat's Worst Christmas Ever (2014) (puppets and stand-in puppets)
 The Jungle Book (2016) (stand-in puppets)
 Rock Dog (2016) (character design and visual development)
 The Happytime Murders (2018)
 Earth to Ned (2020)
 Duff's Happy Fun Bake Time (2021)
 Pinocchio (2022) (visual effects)
 Five Nights at Freddy's (TBA) (animatronics)

Other 
 Snuggle (Snuggle Bear)
 LendingTree (Lenny)
 Jack in the Box (Muppet Jack)
 Hamburger Helper (Hamburger Helper Glove)
 Henson Alternative
 Puppet Up! - Uncensored
 53rd Annual Grammy Awards (2011)
 Nintendo E3 Presentation (2015)
 Coldplay's'' Music of the Spheres (The Weirdos)
 "Biutyful" music video

See also 
 Practical effect
 Creature suit

References

External links 
 

Mass media companies established in 1979
Creature Shop
Companies based in Los Angeles County, California
Entertainment companies of the United Kingdom
Entertainment companies of the United States
Visual effects companies
American animation studios
Animatronics companies
Puppet designers
1979 establishments in England